Judge Dredd: Grud is Dead is a Big Finish Productions audio drama based on the character Judge Dredd in British comic 2000 AD.

Plot
Judge Dredd encounters Devlin Waugh again, when the vampire is kidnapped by a sect of the Holy Inquisition and taken to Vatican City to be the subject of an occult ritual to resurrect Grud.

Cast
Toby Longworth - Judge Dredd
Peter Guinness - Devlin Waugh
Katarina Olsson - Concepcion
Daniel Barzotti - Sextus
Jez Fielder - Judge Logan/Inquisitor Venti
Ian Brooker - Cesare

External links
Big Finish Productions

2004 audio plays
Judge Dredd